Many local, regional and international artists have performed at Rogers Arena, Vancouver, Canada, spanning a wide range of musical genres. A list of concerts that were held at the venue are given in the table below, while other non-concert entertainment events are also included.

1995 - 2010

2011 - present

References 

Entertainment events at Rogers Arena
Entertainment events in Canada
Lists of events in Canada
Events in Vancouver
Entertainment events at Rogers Arena
Lists of events by venue